The 1972 Army Cadets football team represented the United States Military Academy during the 1972 NCAA University Division football season.

Schedule

Personnel
DE #86 Steve Bogosian (C), Sr.

Game summaries

Navy

References

Army
Army Black Knights football seasons
Army Cadets football